Bulgaria–Spain relations are foreign relations between Bulgaria and Spain. Both countries established diplomatic relation on 8 May 1910. Relations were severed in 1946 and were restored in 1970 at the level of Consular Office and Trade Mission. Since 27 January 1970, the diplomatic relations were elevated to embassy level. Bulgaria has an embassy in Madrid and an honorary consulate in Barcelona. Spain has an embassy in Sofia.
Both countries are full members of the European Union and NATO.
Spain has given full support to Bulgaria's membership in the European Union and NATO.

Bilateral relations 
Spanish-Bulgarian relations are currently considered excellent. Spain is a relevant trading partner for Bulgaria and a prominent investor. In addition, Spain is one of the preferred destinations for Bulgarian emigration and the main issuer of remittances received by the Balkan country from abroad. In the political sphere, Spain has always supported Bulgaria's integration into community institutions and other international organizations. Cooperation in this regard has been oriented towards institutional strengthening and the formation of human capital. Despite having a privileged location, in an area of strategic value where access roads between the Balkans, Eastern Europe and Turkey converge, Bulgaria cannot yet take advantage of the full commercial potential of its geographical location due to the lack of transport infrastructure (especially land), which prevent direct exports from countries like Spain.

Royal visits to Bulgaria 
 King Juan Carlos and Queen Sofia of Spain
 23–25 May 1993 – Sofia
 8–10 June 2003 – Sofia and Plovdiv
 The Prince of Asturias and The Princess of Asturias
 9–10 February 2006 – Sofia
(expected) July 2013 - Delegation from Vigo (Galicia, Spain) headed by A.Yllera - Sofia, Plovdiv and Pleven.

Resident diplomatic missions
 Bulgaria has an embassy in Madrid.
 Spain has an embassy in Sofia.

See also 
 Foreign relations of Bulgaria
 Foreign relations of Spain
 Bulgarians in Spain
 Spanishs in Bulgaria
 Accession of Bulgaria to the European Union

External links 
 Bulgarian embassy in Madrid
 Spanish Ministry of Foreign Affairs about relations with Bulgaria (in Spanish only)
 Spanish embassy in Sofia (in Bulgarian and Spanish only)

References 

 
Spain
Bilateral relations of Spain